Indiana Jones and the Last Crusade is a 1991 action video game for the NES. It was developed and published by Taito, and is based on the 1989 film of the same name.

Plot and gameplay
In the game, the player controls the protagonist, Indiana Jones, navigating through levels taken directly from the film. The game begins in the year 1938, with Jones receiving a package from Venice, Italy, which turns out to be his father's Grail diary. At the same time, he receives a telegram from Marcus Brody telling him the Cross of Coronado is on a ship off the coast of Portugal. The player can then choose between recovering the Cross of Coronado or going to Venice first.

If the player goes to recover the Cross, Jones must board a ship and defeat a certain number of Panama Hat's henchmen before fighting the boss himself. The player can also head to Venice where they are presented with a sliding puzzle challenge, which must be completed before a fire engulfs the room they are in. By solving the puzzle in time, the player receives a sketch showing the true holy grail. Jones then receives a telegraph from Sallah telling him that Henry Jones, Sr. was taken captive by the Nazis and is being held at Castle Brunwald and that Marcus Brody has gone missing. After finishing the next mission, Jones receives another telegraph telling him the location of the Holy Grail.

Saving Marcus takes place on top of a German tank in Iskenderun, where the player has to kill Nazis before the tank plunges over a cliff. At Castle Brunwald, the player must navigate a dense maze to find Henry Jones Sr.

In several missions, if the player fails, it causes the Nazis to steal Henry's diary, and Jones must travel to Berlin to recover it via a motorcycle riding sequence.

The final level of the game takes place in the Lost Temple. The player must carefully navigate the floor to spell out the word "Jehovah"; stepping on the wrong tile will fail the puzzle, and if the player takes too long, the torch goes out. Afterward Jones will reach the final sanctum containing the Knight and several "grails". If the player has the sketch from Venice, it will aid in identifying the correct Grail. Choosing the correct Grail will show the ending.

The game presents bitmapped pictures of the actors from the film of the same name, including Harrison Ford, Sean Connery, and Alison Doody.

Reception
Robert Swan of Computer and Video Games gave the game an 89% rating. Swan praised the graphics, music, and sound effects. He went on stating that the game "has got to be one of the best" NES games released up to that point. Nintendo Power noted that the film's many action scenes "translate well" to the game. Skyler Miller of AllGame praised the graphics and music, as well as the cutscenes, but she criticized the gameplay and consequently only gave the game two and a half out of five stars.

References

External links
 
 The Raider.net Retro-Review

1991 video games
 (1991 video game)
Nintendo Entertainment System games
Taito games
Video game sequels
Video games based on films
Video games scored by Tim Follin
Video games developed in the United Kingdom
Last Crusade (1991 video game)
Video games set in castles